Paul Amadeus Pisk (May 16, 1893, Vienna – January 12, 1990, Los Angeles) was an Austrian-born composer and musicologist.  A prize named in his honor is the highest award for a graduate student paper at the annual meeting of the American Musicological Society.

Pisk earned his doctorate in musicology from Vienna University in 1916, studying under Guido Adler. Afterwards he studied conducting at the Imperial Academy of Music and the Performing Arts graduating in 1919. His teachers there included Franz Schreker (counterpoint). Pisk also studied privately with Arnold Schoenberg from 1917 to 1919. He then taught at the Vienna Academy and gave adult education lectures, especially at the Volkshochschule Volksheim Ottakring, where from 1922 to 1934 he was director of the music department. 
He also taught at the New Vienna Conservatory from 1925 to 1926 and the Austro-American Conservatory near Salzburg from 1931 to 1933.
Pisk's students included Leopold Spinner.

He was also a board member, secretary, and pianist in Schoenberg's Society for Private Musical Performances. He was among the founding members of the International Society for Contemporary Music and from 1920 to 1928 was coeditor of Musikblätter des Anbruch and music editor of the Arbeiter-Zeitung.

The first airing of his music by the British Broadcasting Corporation took place on July 3, 1930, when Austrian pianist Friedrich Wührer played Pisk's Suite for Piano.

In 1936 he emigrated to the United States and taught at the University of Redlands (1937–1951), the University of Texas at Austin (1951–1963), and Washington University in St. Louis (1963–1972). He composed orchestral works, ballets, chamber music and songs, as well as writings in music theory. His notable students include Leopold Spinner, Samuel Adler, Gary Lee Nelson, and Thomas F. Hulbert.

Personal history 
Paul's parents were Ludwig Pisk, a secular Jewish lawyer, and Eugenie Pollack, a Protestant.  Paul was the elder of two sons; his younger brother was named Otto.  They were raised Protestant.  Their mother died when Paul was four.  Ludwig remarried and his second wife also bore a son, Hans.   Ludwig was against Paul's becoming a musician but respected academia and relented when he learned Paul could get a doctorate in musicology.  Otto and Paul both served in the Habsburg Army in World War I.  Paul was a supply sergeant for the cavalry.  (They did not serve in the same unit).  Otto was stationed in Montenegro and, according to family lore, was one of the soldiers who built the scale model of Montenegro that can still be seen in the Cetinje Palace today.

Paul married Martha Maria Frank in 1919.   She was also a student of music.  She was from a once-wealthy family from the Habsburg region near Czernowitz.  Martha bore him two sons:  Gerhardt Manuel in 1922 and Georg Michael in 1932.  Gerhardt's name was Anglicized to Gerald when the family emigrated to the U.S.  Gerald died of "valley fever" in his 20s.  George attended Yale, got his PhD in English literature at the University of Texas, and married Rita Gurley in 1958.  They had two children: Camille (born 1960) and Gerald (born 1962, named for Gerhardt).

Martha Pisk died in 1973, only a few months after she and Paul had moved back to Austin, Texas, from St. Louis, Missouri.  After her death, Paul moved to Los Angeles and remarried.  He had known his second wife, singer and voice coach Irene Hanna (born Johanna Schwartz) for many years.  Hanna died in 1981.  Paul Pisk died in Los Angeles in 1990.

In 1935 Paul Amadeus Pisk was made an honorary member of the Le Droit Humain masonic lodge "Humanitas" No. 962 in Zagreb during the era of the Kingdom of Yugoslavia.

Major publications 
 PA Pisk, "Max Reger, Briefwechsel mit Herzog Georg II von Sachsen-Meiningen." Journal of the American Musicological Society, Vol. 3, No. 2,149-151. Summer, 1950. 
 PA Pisk – "Subdivision of Tones: A Modern Music Theory and Philosophy" Bulletin of the American Musicological Society, 1942, v.36 
 PA Pisk  "The Fugue Themes in Bach's Well-Tempered Clavier" Bulletin of the American Musicological Society,  No. 8 (Oct., 1945), pp. 28–29- 
Compositions :
 Der große Regenmacher, 1931 (szenisches Ballett)
 Schattenseite, 1931 (Monodram)
 Passacaglia for orchestra
 String quartet

Notes

References 
 Jennifer Ruth Doctor, The BBC and Ultra-modern Music, 1922–1936: Shaping a Nation's Tastes (1999) – Cambridge University Press
 J Glowacki. Paul A. Pisk: Essays in His Honor (1966) – College of Fine Arts, University of Texas
 E Antokoletz, "A Survivor of the Vienna Schoenberg Circle: An Interview with Paul A. Pisk"  Tempo, Tempo, New Ser., No. 154, 15–21.(1985)

External links 
 AEIOU
 Interview with Paul Pisk, October 22, 1986
 Interview with Paul Pisk (in German) in the online archive of the Österreichische Mediathek

Austrian emigrants to the United States
Austrian classical composers
American male classical composers
American classical composers
Second Viennese School
Austrian musicologists
Austrian Jews
American people of Austrian-Jewish descent
Musicians from Vienna
1893 births
1990 deaths
Pupils of Arnold Schoenberg
20th-century classical composers
20th-century American composers
20th-century American musicologists
20th-century American male musicians
University of Vienna alumni
University of Music and Performing Arts Vienna alumni
University of Redlands faculty
University of Texas at Austin faculty
Washington University in St. Louis faculty